Judy Zebra "J. Z." Knight (born Judith Darlene Hampton; March 16, 1946) is an American spiritual teacher and author known for her purported channelling of a spiritual entity named Ramtha. Critics consider her to be a cult leader.

Knight has appeared on US TV shows, such as Larry King, MSNBC and The Merv Griffin Show, as well as in media such as Psychology Today.  Her teachings have attracted figures from the entertainment and political world such as Linda Evans and Shirley MacLaine. Knight claims to bridge ancient wisdom and the power of consciousness together with the latest discoveries in science. Some of the ideas are similar to those of Shirley MacLaine, which were criticized for being "kindergarten metaphysics" by mathematician and skeptic Martin Gardner. Shirley Maclaine claimed in her book that she was the brother of Ramtha in their Atlantean past lives.  Ramtha's teachings have been criticized by scientists and skeptics. The Southern Poverty Law Center has criticized Knight for "homophobic, anti-Catholic, anti-Semitic racist rants".

Knight lives in a  French chateau-style home in Yelm, Washington, teaches courses and runs Ramtha's School of Enlightenment.

Knight has been married three times and is the mother of two children from her first marriage, which ended in divorce.

Career
Knight grew up in poverty. After graduating from high school, she dropped out of business school. She later worked in the cable television industry, and due to her work moved to Tacoma, Washington, where, according to her autobiography, a psychic told her the "Enlightened One" would appear to her in the future. She says that Ramtha first appeared to her in her kitchen in 1977.

Knight appeared on The Merv Griffin Show in 1985 and wrote the autobiographical A State of Mind in 1987. Time called her "probably the most celebrated of all current channelers". She is currently the president of JZK, Inc and Ramtha's School of Enlightenment, located near the town of Yelm, Washington. Knight owns several U.S. trademark registrations featuring the "Ramtha" name. She appeared in the 2004 film What the Bleep Do We Know!?, produced by members of the Ramtha School.

Ramtha

"Ramtha" (the name is claimed to be derived from Ram and to mean "the God" in Ramtha's language) is a reputed entity whom Knight says she channels. According to Knight, Ramtha was a Lemurian warrior who fought the Atlanteans over 35,000 years ago. Knight claims Ramtha speaks of leading an army over 2.5 million strong (more than twice the estimated world population at about 30,000 BC) for 63 years, and conquering three-fourths of the known world (which was allegedly going through cataclysmic geological changes). According to Knight, Ramtha led the army for 10 years until he was betrayed and almost killed.

Knight maintains Ramtha spent the next seven years in isolation recovering and observing nature, the seasons, his army making homes and families, and many other things. She says he later mastered many skills, including foresight and out-of-body experiences, until he led his army to the Indus River while in his late fifties (after having led his army for 63 years). According to Knight, Ramtha taught his soldiers everything he knew for 120 days, then he bade them farewell, rose into the air, and in a bright flash of light he ascended before them. Knight says that he made a promise to his army he would come back to teach them everything he had learned. JZ Knight says that in 1977 Ramtha appeared before her and told her he had come to help her over the ditch. JZ Knight claims to have become his first student of what she calls the great work.

Teachings

Ramtha is the central figure (the "master teacher") of Ramtha's School of Enlightenment, started by Knight in 1987 near the town Yelm, Washington. Classes (or "dialogues") had been held around the world for the previous 10 years. There are currently over 6,000 students of Knight's teachings.

The four cornerstones of Knight's philosophy are:
 The statement 'You are god'
 The directive to make known the unknown
 The concept that consciousness and energy create the nature of reality
 The challenge to conquer yourself

Knight's teachings appear to be a mixture of Jungian philosophy, Western occult traditions and contemporary positive-thinking attitudes (such as New Age beliefs) and have yet to stand against elementary skepticism or scrutiny. Predictions made by Knight in the name of the disembodied entity have either failed to come true (e.g. predicting a holocaust would take place in 1985, or the US would be involved in a major war in 1985) or the predicted scenarios are too wide to evaluate and/or have too large an error margin to be considered, which is usually the case with channelers.

When Knight says she is channeling Ramtha she speaks mostly in English in what sounds like an accent from the British Raj.

In her teachings "Ramtha" has made several controversial statements such as Christianity is a "backward" religion, that Jesus' parables can be explained by means of photon waves and probability, that "murder isn't really wrong or evil" (if one believes in reincarnation), or (during the court case JZ Knight v Jeff Knight) Jeff Knight stated Ramtha had declared HIV is Nature's way of 'getting rid of' homosexuality. The Southern Poverty Law Center observed "Ramtha" has made anti-semitic comments such as ""Fuck God's chosen people! I think they have earned enough cash to have paid their way out of the goddamned gas chambers by now".

Controversy and criticism

Skeptics point to Ramtha's story as proof that he does not exist. Ramtha claims to come from the continent of Lemuria and to have conquered Atlantis. The existence of the two locations is considered of legendary nature, and neither has been found. Furthermore, the claim that Ramtha led an army of 2.5 million contradicts estimates of the world population at 33,000 BC, and her claims of clairvoyant, telepathic, telekinetic and other ESP abilities, for which there is no scientific support,  have been heavily criticized by skeptics and scientific communities.

Magician and skeptic James Randi said that Ramtha's believers have "no way of evaluating [her teachings]", while Carl Sagan in his book The Demon-Haunted World says that "the simplest hypothesis is that Ms. Knight makes 'Ramtha' speak all by herself, and that she has no contact with disembodied entities from the Pleistocene Ice Age." He goes on to write a list of questions that Ramtha's answers to would help us determine whether he is actually a disembodied entity from the paleolithic times (such as "What were the indigenous languages, and social structure?", "What was their writing like?" or "How do we know that he lived 35,000 years ago?"), and ends by saying that "[i]nstead, all we are offered are banal homilies."

Knight's former husband, Jeff Knight, in an interview in 1992 with Joe Szimhart, said that Ramtha's teachings are a "farce" and that they are "just a money making business for [JZ Knight]". He also said that students of Ramtha's School of Enlightenment are "involved in a very dangerous, very evil corrupt thing".

Attacks and criticism against Ramtha's teachings and Ramtha's School of Enlightenment have also been made by former students of the school. David McCarthy, a Yelm resident and former student of the school between 1989 and 1996, has accused the school of being a cult. He further claims that he was intimidated during his studies there, and he felt like mind control was being exerted by Knight and the school. He said "At one point I was running around scared I was going to get eaten by the lizard people." McCarthy became disappointed, not only with his own experience of Ramtha's teachings but also as he had cut ties from his family to become a student as they lived in a different country. This led McCarthy to form a group called "Life After Ramtha's School of Enlightenment", which questions the authenticity of Ramtha and encourages people to come out and express their experiences after their realization that the RSE is a cult. The school has also been characterized as a cult by skeptic Michael Shermer in his book Why People Believe Weird Things.

Glenn Cunningham, a former bodyguard of Knight's, in an interview with David McCarthy details the inner workings of Ramtha's School of Enlightenment and criticizes various activities (such as trademarking ideas and phrases that had been coined by other authors many years before – for example, the idea of "Blue Body", or mixing quantum physics with new age ideas, which can be found in Vera Stanley Alder's From the Mundane to the Magnificent, first published in 1979) of Knight's and aspects of Ramtha which he simply saw as Knight acting. Among the things he mentions is the fact that Ramtha mispronounces the same words that Knight mispronounces, and that Ramtha quotes the same books that Knight has read.

Furthermore, Ramtha's teachings as they are portrayed in the movie What the Bleep Do We Know!?, not only in the general gist of the film (which was directed and funded by students of Ramtha's School of Enlightenment) but also in instances where Ramtha is interviewed on screen, have been heavily criticized by the scientific community,<ref name="ABC">What the Bleep are they On About?! Australian Broadcasting Corporation</ref> and skeptics, such as James Randi.

Court cases
Knight has been involved in several court disputes, some personal and others business-related. She brought a suit against a woman from Berlin named Julie Ravell for disturbing Knight's psychic state and leaving her "hanging in spiritual limbo" during the five years Ravell claimed she was also channeling Ramtha. The case was brought to the supreme court in Vienna and lasted over five years, at the end of which Austria's supreme court awarded copyright to Knight as the sole channeler of Ramtha, and Ravell was made to pay $800 in psychic damages to Knight. Another case involving copyright and trademark ownership was JZK, Inc vs. Glandon, in which Joseph Glandon was accused of distributing copyrighted teachings of Ramtha.

In Knight vs. Knight'' (1992–1995), Jeff Knight alleges that he lost years of his life by postponing modern medical treatment for his HIV infection, due to advice from his wife that Ramtha could heal him. The court decided against him; he died before he could appeal the court's decision.

Knight, through JZK Inc., accused WhiteWind Weaver, a Thurston County, Washington citizen, of stealing her ideas and using her and Ramtha's teachings in her workshops. A trial began on March 10, 2008, in Thurston County Superior Court and at the end of it Knight was awarded about $10,000 after the court's decision against WhiteWind Weaver.

Knight also refused to attend court as a witness in a case involving a 15-year-old who claimed rape against two students of Ramtha's School of Enlightenment. The 15-year-old girl had written a letter to Knight which mentioned that Wayne Allen Geis, her dancing and acting teacher, had engaged in sexual intercourse with her from 1995 to 1997. The illicit activities had also involved Ruth Beverly Martin. They had apparently told the girl that sexual intercourse would help her to relax and improve her acting ability. Knight invited the girl to a retreat at the school in November 1999. In the retreat, Ramtha questioned the girl, her father, Geis and Martin. This inquiry took place on stage in front of an audience of over 800 people for about an hour. Geis and Martin confessed to having molested the girl, and the school contacted authorities. Charged with 10 counts of first-degree sexual misconduct with a minor, Geis and Martin pleaded not guilty and the case went to trial. Prosecutors were reluctant to have Knight appear in court due to the "circus atmosphere" that would have been created. Knight herself claimed that she had been in a trance and did not remember anything of what was said in the retreat inquiry.

See also
 Channeling
 Extrasensory perception
 New Age Spirituality
 Pseudoscience
 Skepticism
 The Power of Belief
 What The Bleep Do We Know

References

External links

 
 Ramtha's School Of Enlightenment official website

1946 births
Channellers
Living people
American spiritual mediums
Founders of new religious movements
New Age spiritual leaders
People from Roswell, New Mexico
Religion in the Pacific Northwest